South Zhongzhou Road (Hanyu Pinyin: Nan Zhongzhou Lu) is a road lying on the central axis of Beijing. It runs from Yongdingmen Bridge on the southern 2nd Ring Road through to the southern 5th Ring Road.

There is a wide express bus lane on the road, the first in Beijing.

South Zhongzhou Road forms the start of China National Highway 104, which diverts southeast after the intersection with the 4th Ring Road.

Streets in Beijing